Dive is a 1929 German silent film directed by E. W. Emo and starring Igo Sym, and Paul Samson-Körner.

The film's art direction was by Kurt Richter.

Cast

References

Bibliography

External links 
 

1929 films
Films of the Weimar Republic
Films directed by E. W. Emo
German silent feature films
German black-and-white films
1920s German films